Parth may refer to:

People

Given name 
 Parth Bhalerao (born 2000), Indian actor
 Parth Bhut (born 1997), Indian cricketer
 Parth Chauhan (born 1995), Indian cricketer
 Parth Desai (born 1990), Canadian cricketer
 Parth Jindal (born 1990), Indian businessman
 Parth Kohli (born 1989), Indian cricketer
 Parth Oza (born 1986), Indian singer and actor
 Parth Rekhade, Indian cricketer
 Parth Sahani (born 1993), Indian cricketer
 Parth Samthaan (born 1991), Indian actor
 Parth Satwalkar (born 1974), Indian cricketer
 Parth Bharat Thakkar (born 1989), Indian singer, composer, and music director

Surname 
 Benjamin Parth (born 1988), Austrian chef
 Johnny Parth (born 1930), Austrian record producer and musician

Other uses 
 Arjuna, a character of the Mahabharata
 Parth (horse), a racehorse

See also 
 Partha (disambiguation)
 Paath